Tatsuya Tanaka (田中 達也, born June 9, 1992) is a Japanese football player who plays for Avispa Fukuoka in J1 League.   His regular playing position is either as a wide midfielder or a wing-back.   He has previously played for Roasso Kumamoto, FC Gifu, Gamba Osaka, Oita Trinita and Urawa Reds.

Club career

A native of Fukuoka in northern-Kyushu, Tanaka entered Kyushu Sangyo University in 2011.   While completing his university studies he was a specially designated player for Roasso Kumamoto in J2 League and played 4 games for them between 2011 and 2013.   After graduation he signed for Roasso on a full-time basis ahead of the 2015 season.   He scored once in ten appearances in his first season as a professional and found it difficult to get regular game time.   As a result, he was loaned to fellow J2 outfit FC Gifu for 2016 and played 18 times for the men from central Japan, scoring once.

Upon returning to Kumamoto in 2017 he began to play more regularly, making 21 appearances that year before experiencing a career best season in 2018.   He played 40 out of Roasso's 42 league games and found the back of the net 9 times which, although personally good for him, was not enough to save his side from relegation to Japan's third tier.

Tanaka would not join Roasso in the J3 league, however, as his impressive performances as a wing-back for the men in red brought him to the attention of J1 side Gamba Osaka who added him to their squad ahead of the 2019 season.

Club statistics
.

References

External links
 
 
 

1992 births
Living people
Kyushu Sangyo University alumni
Association football people from Fukuoka Prefecture
Japanese footballers
J1 League players
J2 League players
Roasso Kumamoto players
FC Gifu players
Gamba Osaka players
Oita Trinita players
Urawa Red Diamonds players
Avispa Fukuoka players
Association football midfielders